Bevan Kapisi (born 15 August 1981) in Samoa is a footballer who plays as a central midfielder. He has played for Vaivase-Tai, AST Central United, Otahuhu United and the Samoa national football team.

In 2004 he was named to the Samoa national football team for the 2004 OFC Nations Cup.

References

External links
 

1981 births
Living people
Samoan footballers
Samoa international footballers
Association football defenders
Samoan expatriate footballers
Expatriate association footballers in New Zealand
Samoan expatriate sportspeople in New Zealand